Isabelle Wendling (born 30 January 1971, in Boulay-Moselle) is a French handball player and member of a former World Champion France national team.

She became World Champion in 2003, when France won the 2003 World Women's Handball Championship in Croatia, and Wendling was selected for the All-Star team, as pivot.

She represented France at three Olympiads: at the 2000 Summer Olympics in Sydney, when France placed 6th, at the 2004 Summer Olympics in Athens, where the France national team placed 4th, and finishing 5th at the 2008 Summer Olympics in Beijing.

References

External links

1971 births
Living people
People from Boulay-Moselle
French female handball players
Olympic handball players of France
Handball players at the 2000 Summer Olympics
Handball players at the 2004 Summer Olympics
Handball players at the 2008 Summer Olympics
Sportspeople from Moselle (department)